The Bandana Splits are a pop-trio from New York City. The group is made up by Annie Nero, Dawn Landes, and Lauren Balthrop. In August 2011, the group released their first full-length album Mr. Sam Presents through Boy Scout Recordings.

References
1.Chattman, P. (2011, October 14). Huffington Post. A-Sides with Jon Chattman: The Bandana Splits, Mira Black and the Spacetime Continuum. Retrieved November 18, 2011 http://www.huffingtonpost.com/jon-chattman/asides-with-jon-chattman-_3_b_1011142.html

2. The Bandana Splits(2011) . Retrieved November 18, 2011, from https://web.archive.org/web/20120208025836/http://www.ufomusic.com/artist/index.php?artist_id=267

3. The Bandana Splits Q&A(2011). Retrieved November 18, 2011, from http://www.kidzworld.com/article/25947-the-bandana-splits-qanda

4.Deliso, M. (2011, August 8). The Brooklyn Paper. Girl talk: The Bandana Splits are one charming throwback. Retrieved November 18, 2011 http://www.brooklynpaper.com/stories/34/32/24_bandanasplits_2011_08_12_bk.html

5.Sanders, J. (2011, October 5). Pop Matters. Girl talk: The Bandana Splits: Mr. Sam Presents the Bandana Splits. Retrieved November 18, 2011 from http://www.popmatters.com/pm/review/148654-the-bandana-splits-mr-sam-presents-the-bandana-splits

6.Quantick, D. (2011, August 16). BBC. The Bandana Splits Review. Retrieved November 18, 2011 from https://www.bbc.co.uk/music/reviews/jznv

Musical groups from New York City
American musical trios
Musical groups established in 2011
American pop music groups
2011 establishments in New York City